Charf Hill is a hill in Tangier, northern Morocco. Its elevation is 93 metres above sea level and it overlooks the city between the Mediterranean and the Atlantic.

Description
The hill offers a panoramic view of Tangier and the coastline from Cape Malabata in the east to La Montagne in the west. 
Charf Hill has a number of high-rise buildings and towards the foot of the hill are some of the poor residential districts of Tangier and the Plaza de Toros. The Syrian Mosque of Tangier is also located on the hill and is noted for its style of minaret, rare to the region.

Legend says that Charf Hill is the burial place of the massive body of Antaeus after he was defeated by Hercules.

References

External links
L'histoire de Tanger - Tánger

Tangier
Mountains of Morocco